Los Nemus del Pacífico are a Colombian salsa music band.  They are especially known for son montuno music, as highlighted in their video Los Nemus Del Pacifico: Greatest Hits of Salsa & Son Montuno on Discos Fuentes (2005).

Discography
 Grandes Exitos (1995)

References

Colombian salsa musical groups